Paweł Ksawery Brzostowski (1739-1827) was a Polish noble, writer, publicist, and Catholic priest. He held the office of Great Lithuanian Writer since 1762, Canon of Vilnius from 1755 to 1773, and the Great Lithuanian Referendary from 1774 to 1787.

See also 
 Republic of Paulava

References
Tadeusz Turkowski: Brzostowski Paweł Ksawery. W: Polski Słownik Biograficzny. T. 3: Brożek Jan – Chwalczewski Franciszek. Kraków: Polska Akademia Umiejętności – Skład Główny w Księgarniach Gebethnera i Wolffa, 1937, s. 55–56. Reprint: Zakład Narodowy im. Ossolińskich, Kraków 1989, 

1739 births
1827 deaths
18th-century Polish–Lithuanian writers
18th-century Polish–Lithuanian Roman Catholic priests
18th-century Polish nobility
19th-century Polish nobility